Drânceni is a commune in Vaslui County, Western Moldavia, Romania. It is composed of six villages: Albița, Băile Drânceni, Drânceni, Ghermănești, Râșești and Șopârleni.

Albița village is a border crossing point between Moldova and Romania.

References

Communes in Vaslui County
Localities in Western Moldavia
Moldova–Romania border crossings
Populated places on the Prut